The Coastal Collegiate Sports Association is an NCAA Division I college athletic conference.   

Established in 2008, the Coastal Collegiate Swimming Association (CCSA) was originally developed by four regional Division I conferences — the ASUN Conference, Big South Conference, Mid-Eastern Athletic Conference, and the Southern Conference — to create a centralized home for their members with swimming and diving programs. 

In October 2015, the CCSA added the newly recognized NCAA sport of beach volleyball and rebranded itself the Coastal Collegiate Sports Association.

CCSA beach volleyball went through major changes in 2021. The CCSA entered into a beach volleyball partnership with Conference USA (C-USA) under which the 2021 CCSA championship in that sport was split into two groups, with the six full C-USA and Sun Belt Conference members playing in one group. Following the 2021 championship, those six schools—C-USA members Florida Atlantic, FIU, Southern Miss, and UAB, plus Sun Belt members Georgia State and Louisiana–Monroe (ULM)—formed a new C-USA beach volleyball league, with another Sun Belt member, Coastal Carolina, joining them. At the same time, Charleston and UNC Wilmington (UNCW) left CCSA beach volleyball for the ASUN.

The CCSA now has 17 member schools, representing ten states (Arizona, Florida, Georgia, Kentucky, Louisiana, Missouri, North Carolina, South Carolina, Texas, and Virginia).



Members

Former members

Membership timeline

Swimming & Diving Champions

Beach Volleyball Champions

References

External links

Official website

NCAA Division I conferences
College swimming in the United States